The 1923–24 Southern Branch Grizzlies men's basketball team represented the Southern Branch of the University of California during the 1923–24 NCAA men's basketball season and were members of the Southern California Intercollegiate Athletic Conference. The Grizzlies were led by second year head coach Pierce "Caddy" Works and finished the regular season with a record of 8–2 and were second in their conference with a record of 8–2.

Previous season

The 1921–22 Southern Branch Cubs finished with a record of 8–2 and were second in their conference with a record of 8–2 under second year coach Caddy Works.

Roster

Schedule

|-
!colspan=9 style=|Regular Season

Source

References

UCLA Bruins men's basketball seasons
Southern Branch Grizzlies Basketball
Southern Branch Grizzlies Basketball
Southern